Crystal Springs (also spelled Crystalsprings) is an unincorporated community and census-designated place (CDP) in Garland County, Arkansas, United States. It was first listed as a CDP in the 2020 census with a population of 129.

On April 25, 2011, a tornado associated with the 2011 Super Outbreak hit the Crystal Springs area, destroying houses in nearby Sunshine.

Demographics

2020 census

Note: the US Census treats Hispanic/Latino as an ethnic category. This table excludes Latinos from the racial categories and assigns them to a separate category. Hispanics/Latinos can be of any race.

Education
It is in the Lake Hamilton School District.

References

Unincorporated communities in Garland County, Arkansas
Unincorporated communities in Arkansas
Census-designated places in Garland County, Arkansas
Census-designated places in Arkansas